TFI Friday is an entertainment show that was broadcast on Channel 4 television in the United Kingdom. It was produced by Ginger Productions, written by Danny Baker, and hosted by Chris Evans, for the first five series. The sixth series was hosted by several guest presenters. The show was broadcast on Fridays at 6pm from 9 February 1996 to 22 December 2000, with a repeat later that night. Its theme tune was Ron Grainer's theme from Man in a Suitcase, in keeping with Evans' frequent use of 1960s television themes in his work.

A one-off revival episode of the show was broadcast on Channel 4 on 12 June 2015. The episode was well-received; on 23 June 2015, Channel 4 announced that it had commissioned a full revived series, which began airing on 16 October 2015.

In 2016, Channel 4 announced that there were no plans for any further series.

Format
The show regularly featured live music, mostly of the then-popular Britpop school. A snippet of "The Riverboat Song" by Ocean Colour Scene, a band particularly championed by Evans (and the very first band to play on the show, with the same song), was used as an introduction to guests, as they walked the length of a walkway up into the "bar" to be interviewed by the host.

Viewers repeatedly asked if they could have the TFI Friday mug (or one like it) that graced Evans' table every week, so the production company created a limited run of 1,000 mugs. These were offered for sale at a prohibitive price and for a limited period, after which, the remaining stock was destroyed live on air when a washing machine was dropped on to them from the height of the television studio.

Inspiration from/for other shows
During November and December 1999, the show included a segment titled "Someone's Going to Be a Millionaire!", inspired by the ITV game show Who Wants to Be a Millionaire? (which would not have its first million-pound winner until November 2000). TFI Friday paid out the promised £1 million jackpot on 24 December 1999, becoming the first British TV show to do so.

Guest presenters
In the summer of 2000, Channel 4 announced that the sixth series of TFI Friday was to be the last. Chris Evans left the show moments after this announcement, leaving the final series to be presented by several guest presenters.

10 November 2000 – Spice Girls
17 November 2000 – Big Brother 1 contestants ("Nasty" Nick Bateman, Anna Nolan, Craig Phillips, Melanie Hill)
24 November 2000 – Davina McCall and Dermot O'Leary
1 December 2000 – Sara Cox
8 December 2000 – Donna Air and Huey Morgan
15 December 2000 – Davina McCall and Dermot O'Leary
22 December 2000 – Elton John

Controversies

Swearing

The show attracted controversy when Happy Mondays frontman Shaun Ryder appeared on the second episode of the first series, slipped out the word "fuck" during his interview on the show. A week later, Ewan McGregor also slipped out the word "fuck" on the show, when ranting about the Conservative government of the time. A month later, Shaun Ryder was invited back on the show to do a Stars in Their Eyes skit. Ryder performed (as Johnny Rotten) the Sex Pistols' "Pretty Vacant". The section was transmitted live, as it was not an interview. Ryder shouted "fuck" several times. Subsequently, the show was forced to be pre-recorded in later editions and Ryder has been barred from appearing live on any Channel 4 programme – he is the only person listed by name in the Channel 4 transmission guidebook. Despite this, he reappeared for the live 20th Anniversary Special in June 2015.

In episode 2 of the 2015 series, actor Nicholas Hoult was heard saying "oh fuck it" after Chris Evans asked him to play the trombone. Evans immediately apologized afterwards.

Car competition
The show gained more notoriety when as part of a competition, two children were forced to go head-to-head in a stare-out contest to win their parents a car. After the competition was won, the boy who had lost then started to cry, which led the tabloid press to attack the show. The next edition showed the boy with the consolation prize of an assortment of toys, an apparent attempt to mitigate controversy, but which was followed by another staring contest (this time for a speedboat), again ending with the losing child crying. The ITC gave Channel 4 a formal warning following these two incidents, and the competition feature never appeared again on the programme. On the 2015 revival show both losing children, now adults, were invited back and given a free holiday to Barbados with their families. Evans apologised for what had been done to them, saying that it should never have happened.

Selected list of performers

 Aerosmith
 All Saints
 Alanis Morissette
 Ash
 At the Drive-In
 Barenaked Ladies
 The Beautiful South
 Beck
 Björk
 The Black Crowes
 Black Grape
 Bloodhound Gang
 The Bluetones
 Blur
 Bon Jovi
 David Bowie
 Ian Brown
 Bush
 Cast
 Catatonia
 The Charlatans
 Cozy Powell
 Neneh Cherry
 Edwyn Collins
 The Corrs
 Elvis Costello & The Attractions
 The Cranberries
 Sheryl Crow
 The Cure
 The Dandy Warhols
 Dannii Minogue
 Dark Star
 Def Leppard
 Del Amitri
 Depeche Mode
 The Divine Comedy
 Dodgy
 Echo & the Bunnymen
 Echobelly
 Eels
 Elastica
 Electronic
 Embrace
 Faith No More
 Feeder
 Foo Fighters
 Roddy Frame
 Fun Lovin' Criminals
 Garbage
 Gene
 Green Day
 Terry Hall
 Happy Mondays
 PJ Harvey
 Headswim
 Hurricane No. 1
 INXS
 James
 Jamiroquai
 Julian Lennon
 Kula Shaker
 Kylie Minogue
 Lenny Kravitz
 Liam Gallagher
 The Lightning Seeds
 Longpigs
 Madness
 Manic Street Preachers
 Mansun
 Menswear
 Mercury Rev
 Metallica
 The Mighty Mighty Bosstones
 Moby
 Morcheeba
 Morrissey
 Muse
 Napalm Death
 New Order
 New Radicals
 No Doubt
 Ocean Colour Scene
 Page and Plant
 Pet Shop Boys
 Placebo
 Iggy Pop
 The Presidents of the United States of America
 Primal Scream
 Prince
 Pulp
 R.E.M.
 Red Hot Chili Peppers
 Reef
 Republica
 Rialto
 Rocket from the Crypt
 Roger Daltrey
 Saint Etienne
 The Seahorses
 Shakespears Sister
 Shed Seven
 Brian Setzer
 Simply Red
 Skunk Anansie
 Sleeper
 Slipknot
 Space
 Spacehog
 Spice Girls
 Spiritualized
 Stereophonics
 Sting
 Suede
 Sugababes
 The Sundays
 Super Furry Animals
 Supergrass
 Symposium
 Roger Taylor
 Terrorvision
 Texas
 Tina Turner
 Toploader
 Utah Saints
 Paul Weller

Revival
In September 2005, Evans announced that he would be returning the TFI Friday format to TV, with OFI Sunday airing on ITV. The first edition was broadcast on 20 November 2005 but was not as successful and quickly axed. On 30 July 2014, Evans announced during his BBC Radio 2 breakfast show that TFI Friday could be returning to Channel 4, after being asked to host a 20th anniversary special (despite the gap having been only been 19 years), as well as a new series, in 2015. During his radio breakfast show on 24 February 2015, Evans revealed that the show would return on Channel 4 on 12 June. It aired from the Cochrane Theatre in Holborn, TFI Fridays earlier home at Riverside Studios having been demolished.

On 23 June 2015, it was confirmed that Channel 4 had commissioned a new series, which started airing on 16 October 2015, with U2 opening and closing the show. On 7 July 2016, Channel 4 confirmed it had "no plans" to commission more episodes of TFI Friday.

Episodes

 The Open Mic Night special only featured the Open Mic performances in the repeat. Due to time restraints, none of the performances could be broadcast during the first broadcast and were later edited into the repeat (making the repeat 85 mins long instead of the usual 60). ELO's performance of "Livin' Thing" was also only broadcast during the repeat.

Regular features
Features on the show included:
 Freak or Unique – Every week, there would be five people waiting outside the studio, of whom three would be selected to show off a special if freakish talent (such as juicing an orange with their shoulders, or The Girl Who Cried Milk). A running gag throughout the run was the 'Incredibly Tall Old Lady' who would always be waiting outside the studio. She was never nominated (mainly because it was obviously an old woman standing on a box)
 Baby Left Baby Right: A small child was placed on a cushion and the guest was asked which way it might fall
 Fat lookalikes – People who looked like fat versions of celebrities which was then followed in later series by Asian lookalikes
 What Does the Fat Bloke Do? – An overweight man was invited on set and asked about his occupation, before dancing and leaving
 Comment from the Cafe – Evans would rope in Cedric (the proprietor of a local eatery) to perform various embarrassing skits. Cedric became famous for his catchphrase "Hellooooooooo!" and wooden acting
 Ugly Blokes – Unattractive gentlemen would have the opportunity to turn down the amorous advances of a 'gorgeous girl' (Catalina Guirado). A photo of footballer Peter Beardsley was shown during the 'Ugly Bloke' theme tune
 It's Your Letters – A wide assortment of viewers' letters (this was introduced by a burst of Reef's "Place Your Hands", re-recorded for the show with the words "It's Your Letters" replacing the original chorus of "Put your hands on").
 Fishbowl Challenge: A goldfish in a bowl would have two toy bridges for company. Which would it swim under first?
 Another running gag was directed at the show's producer, Will Macdonald (aka Wicked Will of MTV's Most Wanted fame), where everyone in the bar would point their fingers, begin to swivel them and chant 'Wiiillll' very creepily
 Will: Pub Genius – Will Macdonald would demonstrate a trick that could be performed using tools commonly found in a pub
 Wooden Bird with Purple Hair – Chris Evans would amuse the audience with a small nodding wooden woodpecker (with purple hair), that slid down a pole whilst an accompanying song was played.
 The Lord of Love – The veteran actor Ronald Fraser dressed in a quilted smoking jacket would recite love poems to girls in the audience.
Wurthers – The shows cue card man. He became a frequent star of the show alongside Chris, during the last series of the show in which he was the host. At the start of every show, they would both engage in telling a joke working alongside each other, with Wurthers finishing the joke with "I'm only joking of course!", with Chris then replying "He's only joking of course!". This became a frequent running gag before eventually fading out, with this being replaced with Chris sending Wurthers out on a task. The first and most memorable of these was sending him outside to look for a mini driver, while it was raining. Near the end of the show, he found one and told her to say hello to the actor Minnie Driver, by waving at the camera who was at the same time being interviewed on the show with David Duchovny. The segment was originally a one-off, before being made a regular feature on the show.
 Show Us Your Face Then – someone in a football mascot outfit is introduced to the audience and invited to show them their real face.
 Sink or Swim – The studio audience (and viewers) were invited to speculate as to whether a chosen animal (e.g. a mouse or a snake) would sink or swim in a fish tank. To gasps of concern from the audience, the mouse turned out to be a good swimmer.

2015 series
 Too good not to be on TV - Unheard of acts appear on the show performing their talents. 
 Slip and slide - Guests see who can go down the slip and slide the fastest. 
 Cute contest purely for ratings - A celebrity will judge which thing or person is the cutest out of a possible three. 
 Noah's killer question - Evans' son Noah asks a question in order to try and put them under pressure. 
 It's Your Letters – Viewers' letters read out. Introduced by Coldplay, who took over from Reef in episode 4.

Transmissions

References

External links

2000s British television series
1996 British television series debuts
2015 British television series endings
Channel 4 original programming
Ginger Productions
British television talk shows
British television series revived after cancellation